Aloys I (Aloys Josef Johannes Nepomuk Melchior; 14 May 1759 – 24 March 1805) was the Prince of Liechtenstein from 18 August 1781 until his death in 1805. He was born in Vienna, the third son of Franz Josef I, Prince of Liechtenstein.

Aloys was enlisted in the military as a youth but withdrew due to poor health. His great interest was forestry and gardening and had many trees from overseas planted around his manors for both economic and aesthetic reasons. He also decorated Eisgrub Park with ornamental buildings.
Aloys I supported mining operations within his lands in Moravia in order to raise money. This included the construction of an ironworks at Olomouc.

Aloys I also expanded the Liechtenstein library through the purchase of complete collections of books. Aloys I had the architect Joseph Hardtmuth design a new palace in Herrengasse, Vienna. He hired a seasonal theater group and a permanent music group.

During his reign, Liechtenstein carried out the last execution in its history when Barbara Erni was beheaded in Eschen for theft.

He was the 836th Knight of the Order of the Golden Fleece in Austria.

Aloys married Karoline Gräfin von Manderscheid-Blankenheim (14 November 1768, in Köln – 11 June 1831, in Vienna) in Feldsberg on 15 November/16 November 1783. The couple were childless. Following Aloys' death in Vienna, Liechtenstein went to his brother Johann I.

References

External links 
 Princely House of Liechtenstein

1759 births
1805 deaths
Knights of the Golden Fleece of Austria
Princes of Liechtenstein
18th-century Liechtenstein people
19th-century Liechtenstein people